The Cheyenne Warriors were a professional indoor football team which was most recently a member of the Developmental Indoor Football League. Based in Cheyenne, Wyoming, the Warriors played their home games at the Cheyenne Ice and Events Center. The team had been a member of the Indoor Football League with intent to play in the 2013 IFL season until the principal owner's death forced them to withdraw from the IFL.

History
For their inaugural season, the Warriors played in the American Professional Football League, finishing at the bottom of the league standings at 0-8.

Beginning in 2013, the Warriors were scheduled to play in the Indoor Football League. The Warriors were expected to form strong rivalries with fellow I-25 team the Colorado Ice as well as their in-state rivals from Casper the Wyoming Cavalry. On January 21, 2013, the IFL announced that the team would not be entering the league as planned due to the late December 2012 death of the team's owner.

In January 2013 the Warriors announced that they were forming a new league, the Developmental Indoor Football League. The team played several games in the DIFL before folding in late May 2013, citing financial issues.

Coaches of note

Head coaches

Coaching staff

Statistics and records

Season-by-season results
Note: The Finish, Wins, Losses, and Ties columns list regular season results and exclude any postseason play.

References

External links
Cheyenne Warriors official website
Indoor Football League official website

Sports in Cheyenne, Wyoming
American football teams in Wyoming
Organizations based in Cheyenne, Wyoming
American football teams established in 2011
American football teams disestablished in 2013
2011 establishments in Wyoming
2013 disestablishments in Wyoming